Ahmad Khaziravi (July 23, 1989 in Abadan, Iran) is an Iranian football player currently playing for Bargh Shiraz F.C. in Azadegan League.

Club career

Club career statistics

Club career
Khaziravi made his first senior team appearance for Esteghlal F.C. on August 5, 2008, against F.C. Aboumoslem

Iran's Premier Football League
Winner: 1
2008–09 with Esteghlal

External links

Profile at Iranproleague.net

Iranian footballers
Esteghlal F.C. players
Pas players
Bargh Shiraz players
People from Abadan, Iran
Living people
Iranjavan players
1989 births
Association football forwards
Sportspeople from Khuzestan province